Charles-Guillaume Alexandre (ca.1735 – 1787 or 1788) was a French classical violinist and composer.

Biography 
Born in Paris, Alexandre was a violinist at the Théâtre de l'Opéra-Comique from 1753 to 1755. Master of music at the Dubugrarre School of Music (1760), he became first violin of the Duke of Aiguillon then in 1783, violin teacher in Paris. He wrote operas and instrumental music.

Works 
1755: Le Triomphe de l'amour conjugal, spectacle orné de machines, lyrics by Giovanni Niccolo Servandoni
1756: La Conquête du Mogol par Thamas Kouli-Kan, roi de Perse, et son triomphe, spectacle à machines, lyrics by Servandoni
1761: Georget et Georgette, one-act opéra-comique, libretto by Harny de Guerville
1764: Dictionnaire lyrique portatif, ou Choix des plus jolies ariettes de tous les genres disposées pour la voix et les instrumens avec les paroles françoises sous la musique, 2 volumes, Didot
1765: La Belle Arsène, opéra-comique, lyrics by Charles-Simon Favart, music by Pierre-Alexandre Monsigny, ouverture by C-G Alexandre
1765: Les beaux airs ou simphonies chantantes pour deux violons, deux hautbois ou flute, basso fagotto et cors à volonté
1765: Le Tonnelier, one-act opéra comique, libretto by Nicolas-Médard Audinot and François-Antoine Quétant, music by Charles-Guillaume Alexandre, Nicolas-Médard Audinot, François-Joseph Gossec, Josef Kohaut, François-André Danican Philidor, Johann Schobert and Jean-Claude Trial
1766: Le Petit-maître en province, one-act comedy in verses, libretto by Guerville
1766: Premier Recueil d'Ariettes choisies avec accompagnement de guitare par Melle Paisible et de violon à volonté par Mr son frère avec basse chiffrée
1767: L'Esprit du jour, comedy by Guerville
1770: Concerto d'airs choisis à sept parties. Main violin, concertmaster, second violin, two oboes or flutes, viola viola, bass and two cors ad libitum
1771: Romance du Petit maître en province, 1771
 Concert d'airs en quatuor, for two violins, viola and bass or one flute, 4 parts
1776: Six Duetto pour deux violons, 2 vol
undated: Livre d'airs sérieux, tendres et a boire a une et a deux voix avec la basse continue

Bibliography 
 J. Goizet, A. Burtal, Dictionnaire universel du Théâtre en France, 1867,  (Read online)
 Encyclopedia of Performing Arts, vol.1, 1975, 
 Chappell White, From Vivaldi to Viotti: A History of the Early Classical Violin Concerto, 1992, 
 Francesco Cotticelli, Paologiovanni Maione, Le arti della scena e l'esotismo in età moderna, 2006

References

External links 
 Alexandre (Alessandro), Charles-Guillaume (Operone.de)

1730s births
1780s deaths
Musicians from Paris
18th-century French male classical violinists
French male classical composers
French opera composers